Paulden is a census designated place (CDP) in Yavapai County, Arizona, United States.  The population was 5,231 at the 2010 census.

Geography

Paulden is located at  (34.900785, -112.484205).

According to the United States Census Bureau, the CDP has a total area of 62.8 square miles (162.7 km2), of which, 62.8 square miles (162.5 km2)  is land and 0.1 square mile (0.2 km2)  (0.10%) is water.

Demographics

As of the census of 2010, there were 5,231 people, 1,917 households, and 1,420 families living in the CDP. There were 1,334 housing units at an average density of 21.3/sq mi (8.2/km2). The racial makeup of the CDP was 82.8% White, 0.7% Black or African American, 1.4% Native American, 0.4% Asian, 0.1% Pacific Islander, 11.9% from other races, and 2.8% from two or more races. 24.3% of the population were Hispanic or Latino of any race.

There were 1,420 households, out of which 27.2% had children under the age of 18 living with them, 60.0% were married couples living together, 7.7% had a female householder with no husband present, and 25.9% were non-families. 20.2% of all households were made up of individuals, and 6.7% had someone living alone who was 65 years of age or older.  The average household size was 2.73 and the average family size was 3.14.

In the CDP, the population was spread out, with 26.8% under the age of 19, 6.2% from 20 to 24, 20.9% from 25 to 44, 32.9% from 45 to 64, and 14.9% who were 65 years of age or older.  The median age was 43.4 years. For every 100 females, there were 102.7 males.  For every 100 females age 18 and over, there were 103.0 males.

The median income for a household in the CDP was $41,402, and the median income for a family was $43,267. Males had a median income of $25,573 versus $22,781 for females. The per capita income for the CDP was $17,064.  About 22.7% of families and 26.9% of the population were below the poverty line, including 45.7% of those under age 18 and 13.0% of those age 65 or over.

Notable people
 Jeff Cooper, founder of the Gunsite Training Center.
 Andy Tobin, majority leader of the Arizona House of Representatives
 Hyram Yarbro, social media personality and skin care commentator

References

Census-designated places in Yavapai County, Arizona